General elections were held in Western Samoa on 4 February 1961. They had originally been planned for November 1960, but were postponed by three months.

Electoral system
The Legislative Assembly had 46 elected members, of which 41 were Samoans elected in single-member constituencies (with voting limited to matais, and five were Europeans elected form a single national constituency.

Campaign
In 21 of the 41 Samoan constituencies there was only one candidate, who was returned unopposed, whilst two had no candidates. Elections went ahead in the remaining 18 constituencies, with by-elections held for the two vacant seats in March.

Although the number of voters on the European roll dropped by around half compared to the 1957 elections, eight candidates contested the five available seats.

Results

European seats

Aftermath
Following the elections, petitions were submitted to the High Court regarding alleged malpractice in the Faasaleleaga I, Palaluli East, Faleata West and European constituencies. The petition by losing candidate William Betham to have the European results annulled on the basis that 55 voters had been added to the voter roll after registration closed was dismissed, with the judge stating that it was not an irregularity and would not have affected the results.

Former Minister of Agriculture Tualaulelei Mauri submitted a petition seeking to overturn his 46–42 vote defeat by Afoafouvale Misimoa in Palauli East, where he claimed that a death oath had been placed on voters by a local chief if Misimoa was not elected. However, his case was dismissed due to contradictory evidence. The petition concerning the result in Faasaleleaga I (Magele Ate had been elected unopposed) was successful, with a by-election ordered for 10 June.

Government formation
A government was appointed by Prime Minister Fiame Mata'afa Faumuina Mulinu'u II.

See also
List of members of the Legislative Assembly of Western Samoa (1961–1964)

References

Western Samoa
1961 in Western Samoa Trust Territory
Elections in Samoa
February 1961 events in Oceania